LISTA is a Swiss-based manufacturer of furniture for workshops and warehouses. The company's products include cabinets, shelving, work surfaces, and benches, as well as equipment for materials and parts handling.

History
The company was founded by under the name "Lienhard Stahlbau" by Alfred Lienhard on February 17, 1945. It was operated out of a leased house in Degersheim, Switzerland. Early products included chairs and tables made of steel tube. An attempts to diversify into appliances by manufacturing refrigerators was not successful and resulted in Lienhard focusing on storage systems for workshops.

By 1951, the company had outgrown its Degersheim premises and is moved to a factory in Erlen in April of that year. Two years later, the name LISTA was first used on mopeds that the factory began to produce. Approximately six hundred mopeds were finished over several months, but the company found that it was unable to compete with foreign motorbike manufacturers and moped production was stopped.

In 1970, Alfred Lienhard suffered a heart attack and control of LISTA was transferred to his son, Fredy Lienhard. Fredy continued to expand international business, particularly in the United States, purchasing their partner Deluxe. Over the next few years, offices and warehouses are established in Holliston, Massachusetts, Dallas, Texas, and Long Beach, California.  in 1972, Deluxe-LISTA became the LISTA International Corporation.  In 2012, Stanley Black & Decker completed the acquisition of Lista North America.

References

External links
listacabinets.com

Manufacturing companies of Switzerland
Manufacturing companies established in 1945
Swiss companies established in 1945